The Asian section of the FIVB Volleyball Men's World Championship qualification acts as qualifiers for the FIVB Volleyball Men's World Championship, for national teams which are members of the Asian Volleyball Confederation (AVC), the sport's continent governing body. A total of 4+1 slots (4 direct slots and 1 host slot) in the final tournament are available for AVC teams.

Qualified teams
 Note: No qualifications – free entrance from 1949 to 1962.

Results (final round)
This table only shows the teams that qualified for the FIVB Men's World Championship through the Asian Qualification Tournaments and does  not include the teams that qualified for the World Championship through the Asian Men's Volleyball Championship, the Intercontinental Qualifications or the World Ranking.

References

Notes

Volleyball competitions in Asia